Alam is a masculine name derived from several ancient languages.

Alam or ALAM may also refer to:

Places
Alam's House (خانه اعلم), a historical house in Isfahan, Iran
Alam Bridge, bridge in Pakistan known for Alam Bridge inscriptions

Organizations 
Association of Licensed Automobile Manufacturers, activist organization
Alam Group, a privately owned conglomerate in Uganda

Other uses 
 Alam (flag), a type of Islamic flagpole with finial used in Islamic societies

See also 
Alama, a given name and surname
Alamabad (disambiguation)
Alamal (disambiguation) (al-amal "hope" or al-ʿamal "work")

Alum, chemical compound